Humanist Manifesto is the title of three manifestos laying out a humanist worldview.  They are the original Humanist Manifesto (1933, often referred to as Humanist Manifesto I), the Humanist Manifesto II (1973), and Humanism and Its Aspirations (2003, a.k.a. Humanist Manifesto III).  The Manifesto originally arose from religious humanism, though secular humanists also signed.

The central theme of all three manifestos is the elaboration of a philosophy and value system which does not necessarily include belief in any personal deity or "higher power", although the three differ considerably in their tone, form, and ambition.  Each has been signed at its launch by various prominent members of academia and others who are in general agreement with its principles.

In addition, there is a similar document entitled A Secular Humanist Declaration published in 1980 by the Council for Secular Humanism.

Humanist Manifesto I

The first manifesto, entitled simply A Humanist Manifesto, was written in 1933 primarily by Roy Wood Sellars and Raymond Bragg and was published with 34 signatories including philosopher John Dewey.  Unlike the later ones, the first Manifesto talked of a new "religion", and referred to Humanism as a religious movement to transcend and replace previous religions that were based on allegations of supernatural revelation.  The document outlines a fifteen-point belief system, which, in addition to a secular outlook, opposes "acquisitive and profit-motivated society" and outlines a worldwide egalitarian society based on voluntary mutual cooperation, language which was considerably softened by the Humanists' board, owners of the document, twenty years later.

The title "A Humanist Manifesto"—rather than "The Humanist Manifesto"—was intentional, predictive of later Manifestos to follow, as indeed has been the case. Unlike the creeds of major organized religions, the setting out of Humanist ideals in these Manifestos is an ongoing process. Indeed, in some communities of Humanists the compilation of personal Manifestos is actively encouraged, and throughout the Humanist movement it is accepted that the Humanist Manifestos are not permanent or authoritative dogmas but are to be subject to ongoing critique.

Humanist Manifesto II

The second Manifesto was written in 1973 by Paul Kurtz and Edwin H. Wilson, and was intended to update and replace the previous one.  It begins with a statement that the excesses of Nazism and World War II had made the first seem "far too optimistic", and indicated a more hardheaded and realistic approach in its seventeen-point statement, which was much longer and more elaborate than the previous version.  Nevertheless, much of the unbridled optimism of the first remained, with hopes stated that war would become obsolete and poverty would be eliminated.

Many of the proposals in the document, such as opposition to racism and weapons of mass destruction and support of strong human rights, are fairly uncontroversial, and its prescriptions that divorce and birth control should be legal and that technology can improve life are widely accepted today in much of the Western world.  Furthermore, its proposal of an international court has since been implemented.  However, in addition to its rejection of supernaturalism, various controversial stances are strongly supported, notably the right to abortion.

Initially published with a small number of signatures, the document was circulated and gained thousands more, and indeed the AHA website encourages visitors to add their own names.  A provision at the end noted that signators do "not necessarily endors[e] every detail" of the document.

Among the oft-quoted lines from this 1973 Manifesto are, "No deity will save us; we must save ourselves," and "We are responsible for what we are and for what we will be," both of which may present difficulties for members of certain Christian, Jewish, and Muslim sects, or other believers in doctrines of submission to the will of an all-powerful God.

Humanist Manifesto III

Humanism and Its Aspirations, subtitled Humanist Manifesto III, a successor to the Humanist Manifesto of 1933, was published in 2003 by the  AHA, and was written by committee.  Signatories included 22 Nobel laureates. The new document is the successor to the previous ones, and the name "Humanist Manifesto" is the property of the American Humanist Association.

The newest manifesto is deliberately much shorter, listing six primary themes, which echo those from its predecessors:

 Knowledge of the world is derived by observation, experimentation, and rational analysis.  (See empiricism.)
 Humans are an integral part of nature, the result of evolutionary change, an unguided process.
 Ethical values are derived from human need and interest as tested by experience.  (See ethical naturalism.)
 Life’s fulfillment emerges from individual participation in the service of humane ideals.
 Humans are social by nature and find meaning in relationships.
 Working to benefit society maximizes individual happiness.

Other Manifestos for Humanism

Aside from the official Humanist Manifestos of the American Humanist Association ("AHA"), there have been other similar documents.  "Humanist Manifesto" is a trademark of the AHA. Formulation of new statements in emulation of the three Humanist Manifestos is encouraged, and examples follow.

A Secular Humanist Declaration

In 1980, the Council for Secular Humanism, founded by Paul Kurtz, which is typically more detailed in its discussions regarding the function of Humanism than the AHA, published what is in effect its manifesto, entitled A Secular Humanist Declaration.  It has as its main points:

 Free Inquiry 
 Separation of Church and State
 The Ideal of Freedom
 Ethics Based on Critical Intelligence
 Moral Education
 Religious Skepticism
 Reason
 Science and Technology
 Evolution
 Education

A Secular Humanist Declaration was an argument for and statement of support for democratic secular humanism.  The document was issued in 1980 by the Council for Democratic and Secular Humanism ("CODESH"), now the Council for Secular Humanism ("CSH"). Compiled by Paul Kurtz, it is largely a restatement of the content of the American Humanist Association's 1973 Humanist Manifesto II, of which he was co-author with Edwin H. Wilson. Both Wilson and Kurtz had served as editors of The Humanist, from which Kurtz departed in 1979 and thereafter set about establishing his own movement and his own periodical. His Secular Humanist Declaration was the starting point for these enterprises.

Humanist Manifesto 2000
Humanist Manifesto 2000: A Call for New Planetary Humanism is a book by Paul Kurtz published in 2000.  It differs from the other three in that it is a full-length book rather than essay-length, and was published not by the American Humanist Association but by the Council for Secular Humanism. In it, Kurtz argues for many of the points already formulated in Humanist Manifesto 2, of which he had been co-author in 1973.

Amsterdam Declaration

The Amsterdam Declaration 2002 is a statement of the fundamental principles of modern Humanism passed unanimously by the General Assembly of the International Humanist and Ethical Union (IHEU) at the 50th anniversary World Humanist Congress in 2002. According to the IHEU, the declaration "is the official statement of World Humanism."

It is officially supported by all member organisations of the IHEU including:

American Humanist Association
British Humanist Association
Humanist Canada
Council of Australian Humanist Societies
Council for Secular Humanism
Gay and Lesbian Humanist Association
Human-Etisk Forbund, the Norwegian Humanist Association
Humanist Association of Ireland
Indian Humanist Union
Philippine Atheists and Agnostics Society (PATAS)

A complete list of signatories can be found on the IHEU page (see references).

This declaration makes exclusive use of capitalized Humanist and Humanism, which is consistent with IHEU's general practice and recommendations for promoting a unified Humanist identity. To further promote Humanist identity, these words are also free of any adjectives, as recommended by prominent members of IHEU. Such usage is not universal among IHEU member organizations, though most of them do observe these conventions.

References

External links

Manifestos
 Humanist Manifesto I (1933)
 Amsterdam Declaration 1952
 Humanist Manifesto II (1973)
 A Secular Humanist Declaration (1980)
 A Declaration of Interdependence(1988)
 IEHU Minimum Statement on Humanism (1996)
 Humanism: Why, What, and What For, In 882 Words (1996)
 Humanist Manifesto 2000: A Call For A New Planetary Humanism 
 The Promise of Manifesto 2000
 Amsterdam Declaration 2002
 Humanism and Its Aspirations: Humanist Manifesto III (2003)
 PDF Printer Friendly Version
 Manifeste pour un humanisme contemporain  (2012)

Miscellaneous
 The Genesis of a Humanist Manifesto by Edwin H. Wilson
 HUUmanists, an association of Unitarian Universalist Humanists
 Notable signers

Humanism
Nontheism publications
Humanist manifestos